The aplomado falcon (Falco femoralis) is a medium-sized falcon of the Americas. The species' largest contiguous range is in South America, but not in the deep interior Amazon Basin. It was long known as Falco fusco-coerulescens or Falco fuscocaerulescens, but these names are now believed to refer to the bat falcon (F. rufigularis). Its resemblance in shape to the hobbies accounts for its old name orange-chested hobby. Aplomado is an unusual Spanish word for "lead-colored", referring to the blue-grey areas of the plumage – an approximate English translation would be "plumbeous falcon". Spanish names for the species include halcón aplomado and halcón fajado (roughly "banded falcon" in reference to the characteristic pattern); in Brazil it is known as falcão-de-coleira.

Description

The aplomado falcon is very slender, long-winged, and long-tailed, the size of a small peregrine falcon (F. peregrinus), at 12–16 in (30–40 cm) long and with an average wingspan of about 36 in (90 cm), but only half the weight, at about 7.3–10.8 oz (208–305 g) in males and 9.6–16 oz (271–460 g) in females. In adult birds, the upperparts are dark blue-grey, as is much of the head, with the usual falcon "moustache" contrasting sharply with the white throat and eyestripe.  The upper breast continues the white of the throat; there are black patches on each side of the lower breast that meet in the middle; the belly and thighs, below the black patches, are light cinnamon.  The tail is black with narrow white or grey bars and a white tip. The cere, eye-ring, and feet are yellow or yellow-orange.

Except that females are bigger than males, the sexes are similar. Juvenile birds are very similar to adults, but their upperparts and belly band are blackish brown, the chest is streaked with black, the white on the head and breast is buffy, and the cinnamon on the underparts is paler, as are the feet.

This species may be confused with the bat falcon (F. rufigularis) and the orange-breasted falcon (F. deiroleucus), which have similar white-black-rust patterns below, but those species are built more like peregrine falcons and have solidly blackish heads and darker rufous bellies. These two species are generally considered to belong to the same lineage as the aplomado falcon. Two other Falco species of the Americas, the merlin (F. columbarius) and the American kestrel (F. sparverius), seem to be closer to the Aplomado group than most other falcons, but the relationships of all these lineages are fairly enigmatic.

Range, ecology and status
The aplomado falcon's habitat is dry grasslands, savannahs, marshes, and, in Brazil, is commonly observed in some large cities, such as São Paulo. It ranges from northern Mexico and Trinidad locally to southern South America, but has been extirpated from many places in its range, including all of northern and central Mexico except for a small area of Chihuahua. Globally, however, it is so widespread that it is assessed as Species of Least Concern by the IUCN.

It feeds on large invertebrates and small vertebrates, with small birds making up the overwhelming bulk of its prey. Mixed-species feeding flocks in open cerrado and grassland will go on frenzied alert upon spotting this species; small birds fear it more than most other predators. It is often seen soaring at twilight hunting insects and eating them on the wing. It also hunts at fields being burned, at which many birds of this species may gather; cooperation between individual aplomado falcons – usually members of a pair – has also been recorded. In Brazil, aplomado falcons have been observed following maned wolves (Chrysocyon brachyurus) and chasing birds that the wolves flush. Prey items typically weigh one-fifth to one-half of the falcons' own weight, but females of this species (which due to their size can tackle larger prey) have been recorded eating birds larger than themselves, such as a cattle egret (Bulbucus ibis) or a plain chachalaca (Ortalis vetula), on rare occasions.

The nest is a platform built of sticks at any height in a bush or tree. Two or three eggs are laid.

Until the 1950s it was found in the extreme southwestern United States, and reintroduction efforts are under way in West and South Texas. It began to reoccupy its former range in West Texas and southern New Mexico in the 1990s. Documentary evidence for these naturally occurring birds was obtained in New Mexico in 1991, and sightings built steadily through that decade and the next, leading to successful fledging of three young in 2002. Sightings and nesting activity continue to the present.  The addition of nesting platforms to areas where Northern Aplomado Falcons Falco femoralis septentrionalis were reintroduced in South Texas improved the birds' productivity.  This resulted in a stable population, however without the addition of nest platforms the re-introduced population would likely decline to extinction.

The expansion of the reintroduction program to that area has met with criticism, because technically, all aplomado falcons in New Mexico are classified as part of the "experimental" (reintroduction) population. As such, while they are still legally protected from hunting, they are not protected by Endangered Species Act requirements to preserve habitat and the like. It is believed that mainly habitat destruction caused the species' (near-)disappearance from the US and hinders reestablishment of a wild breeding population. A coalition of environmental groups is attempting to have full protection restored so as not to jeopardize the success of the expanding wild population and the reintroduction efforts.  A published paper  describes the mixed success of the reintroduction program, carried out by The Peregrine Fund.  Reintroduced birds are now breeding on the Texas coast.  But in the Chihuahuan Desert locations of west Texas and southern New Mexico, the birds were never successful for an extended period of time, and The Peregrine Fund has now abandoned the reintroduction program.

Falconry
The aplomado falcon will chase after game such as small birds and quail, by pursuit flight, which is flying after quarry flushed out. It is mainly acquired from breeders because of its scarcity in the United States, and many falconers in Europe will buy a pair for about £4000. It's admired for its accipiter-like hunting style, which has made the bird famous for being more like an accipiter than a falcon. This is also shown through its determination to catch the quarry even going into heavy cover. They are ideal for quail, doves, and will sometimes even go after squirrel or rabbits. Unfortunately, these birds are also known for carrying their game, like many small falcons, where they try to fly away from the falconer with their catch. The range of quarry vary from sparrows to adult pheasants.  One of the most difficult quarry for the aplomado is the partridge because of its strength, speed and flight distance.

American falconer Jim Nelson has written, "During the time of Shakespeare a new bird from the New World came upon the falconry scene in Spain, Portugal and France.  It was known to courtiers of Henry IV and Louis XIII as the Alethe... prized as "high mettled" partridge hawks...French falconer Charles d'Arcussia is the only writer who actually saw game taken with trained Alethes."  Nelson concluded that the true identity of the Old World Alethe is the modern day aplomado falcon.

References

Further reading

 Stiles, F. Gary & Skutch, Alexander Frank (1989): A guide to the birds of Costa Rica. Comistock, Ithaca.

External links

Page on the Aplomado Falcon from the Peregrine Fund with photographs
 Aplomado Falcon at Global Raptor Information Network
ITIS
Aplomado Falcon photo gallery VIREO
Aplomado Falcon videos on the Internet Bird Collection
The Falconer's Web: Virgilio flies his Aplomado Falcon and talks to John
Aplomado Falcons: Hunters of Steel

aplomado falcon
Birds of Mexico
Native birds of the Southwestern United States
Birds of the Rio Grande valleys
Birds of the Yucatán Peninsula
Birds of the Guianas
Birds of Trinidad and Tobago
Birds of Central America
Birds of prey of South America
aplomado falcon
aplomado falcon
Birds of the Sierra Madre Occidental